Manatí is a city and municipality of Puerto Rico on the northern coast, north of Morovis and Ciales; east of Florida and Barceloneta; and west of Vega Baja. Manatí is spread over 8 barrios and Manatí barrio-pueblo (the downtown area and the administrative center of the city). It is part of the San Juan-Caguas-Guaynabo Metropolitan Statistical Area.

History

Manatí was founded in 1799 by Don Pedro Menendez Valdes. The Iglesia Nuestra Señora de la Candelaria church was built in the seventeenth century and is still standing in its original spot. Manati is known as La Ciudad Metropolitana (The Metropolitan City), and also as Las Atenas de Puerto Rico, (The Athens of Puerto Rico). It is named after a sea mammal, the manatee (the sea cow).

During those early years, the mayor of the town was Jose Aulet. Juan Ponce de León picked the Manatí leg of the Manuatabón River as the first area to pan for gold. The Aulet family owned lands rich in pineapples, sugar cane, and green bananas. The Aulets sold the land to the government in 1985.

In 1853, the region shifted from mining to an expansion of agriculture, particularly cultivation and processing of sugar cane. The demand for and price of sugar remained high in international markets. The main commodity crop was sugar cane. Carpentry also became popular. During that year, the town consisted of 280 homes, 2 squares, 8 streets and a school with 50 pupils.

Puerto Rico was ceded by Spain in the aftermath of the Spanish–American War under the terms of the Treaty of Paris of 1898 and became a territory of the United States. In 1899, the United States Department of War conducted a census of Puerto Rico finding that the population of Manatí was 13,989.

On September 20, 2017 Hurricane Maria struck Puerto Rico.  In Manatí, the hurricane caused major destruction with around 1500 residences destroyed or damaged.  Highways were covered in debris and water, leaving communities incommunicado. The breaching of the Río Grande de Manatí caused the destruction of many structures including around 70 residences.

Geography 
Manatí is on the northern central coast and the Northern Karst.

Barrios 
Like all municipalities of Puerto Rico, Manatí is subdivided into barrios.

Bajura Adentro
Bajura Afuera
Coto Norte
Coto Sur
Manatí barrio-pueblo
Río Arriba Poniente
Río Arriba Saliente
Tierras Nuevas Poniente
Tierras Nuevas Saliente

Sectors
Barrios (which are like minor civil divisions) and subbarrios, in turn, are further subdivided into smaller local populated place areas/units called sectores (sectors in English). The types of sectores may vary, from normally sector to urbanización to reparto to barriada to residencial, among others.

Special Communities

 (Special Communities of Puerto Rico) are marginalized communities whose citizens are experiencing a certain amount of social exclusion. A map shows these communities occur in nearly every municipality of the commonwealth. Of the 742 places that were on the list in 2014, the following barrios, communities, sectors, or neighborhoods were in Manatí: Cerro Gandía, Cerro Quiñones and El Horno.

Demographics

Tourism
In 2014, Manati welcomed its first hotel, the Hyatt Place Hotel and Casino, located next to Casino Atlántico and a LongHorn Steakhouse, which opened in April 2014. The hotel has an outdoor swimming pool, 3 meeting rooms and a fitness center. The official name was Hyatt Place Manati & Casino. Manati is popular for its beaches and is part of the Porta Altantico tourism district.

In 2019, Manatí began offering free tours of its city, beaches, historic places and eateries.

Landmarks and places of interest
Some of the places of interest in Manatí include:

The Acropolis Sports Complex

Historic Zone
 Beach
 Beach and Hacienda Azucarera la Esperanza
, where visitors have been cited for public indecency. (Puerto Rico does not have nudist beaches.)
 Beach, which is considered a dangerous beach.
  Ruins
 
 The New Manati Arena
 Manati Baseball Stadium
 , which is considered a dangerous beach.

Economy

Agriculture
Isidoro Colón established the "Candelaria" sugar mill in the years between 1860 and 1870, located between Manatí and Barceloneta. Manatí is the pineapple center of Puerto Rico. In addition in Manatí, there is cultivation of fruits, sugar cane, and coffee.  is a farming company in Manatí that provides local fruit and vegetables to local chefs.

Industry
The industry of Manatí is shoes, woodwork, and a pineapple cannery as well as pharmaceuticals:
Bristol-Myers Squibb
Warner Chilcott
DuPont
Patheon
Actavis (inside W.C)
Janssen Ortho LLC

Retailers
Burlington store

Symbols
The  has an official flag and coat of arms.

Flag
This municipality has a flag.

Coat of arms
This municipality has a coat of arms.

Healthcare
Manati has two large, private hospitals, Doctor's Center Hospital, and Manati Medical Center Dr. Otero Lopez (formerly the government owned Hospital de Area). There is also the smaller Municipal Hospital.

The area surrounding PR-2 is known for having many medical offices.

Education
Manati has 3 high schools: Petra Corretjer de O'neill High School, Fernando Callejo High School, and the Escuela Instituto Tecnologico Recinto De Manati, the latter also serving as a technical institute.

Private Schools:
Colegio Marista "El Salvador" Manati
Colegio De La Inmaculada
Piaget Bilingual Academy
Academia Discipulos de Cristo
Colegio Hispano Americano
La Reine Christian Bilingual School

Manati's only university is the American University of Puerto Rico, Manati Campus. There are several technical institutes, such as Instituto de Banca y Comercio, Atenas' College, EDC college and Dewey University.

Transportation
There are 15 bridges in Manatí.

Culture

Festivals and events
Manatí celebrates its patron saint festival in February. The  is a religious and cultural celebration that generally features parades, games, artisans, amusement rides, regional food, and live entertainment.

Other festivals and events celebrated in Manatí include:
Los Tubos beach festival – June/July
Mar Chiquita festival – June
Christmas festival – December

Radio stations
WMNT (AM) - Radio Atenas 1500 AM
WNRT FM - Triunfo 96.9 FM

Notable natives and residents

Notable people from Manatí include:
 Cecilia Callejo, dancer and actress
José Miguel Class, singer
 Noel Cuevas, professional baseball player
 Manuel Ramos Otero, poet and LGBT activist
 Carlos Santana Becerra, judge
 Yara Sofia, drag queen
 Antonio Vélez Alvarado, father of the Puerto Rican flag
 Carlos Beltrán, Professional Baseball Outfielder
 Iván Rodríguez, Professional Baseball Player
 Luis Daniel Rivera, actor and politician

Gallery

See also

List of Puerto Ricans
History of Puerto Rico
Did you know-Puerto Rico?

References

External links
 

 
Municipalities of Puerto Rico
Populated places established in 1738
San Juan–Caguas–Guaynabo metropolitan area
1738 establishments in the Spanish Empire